Maja Reshkullit is a mountain in Albania, about 4.5 km southeast of the village Nikç. Maja Reshkullit is part of the Radohima massif of the Accursed Mountains range.

References

External links
Summitpost, Maja Radohines

Mountains of Albania
Accursed Mountains